Robertas Javtokas (born March 20, 1980) is a Lithuanian professional basketball executive and former player. He most recently served as sports director of Žalgiris Kaunas. He has been a member of the senior men's Lithuanian national team since 2004. In the 2001 NBA draft, he was selected by the San Antonio Spurs with the 55th overall pick.

Player profile
Javtokas had very good athletic ability when he was young, with long arms and good coordination. As a young player, he was a good jumper, who had a 40-inch vertical leap and he could easily dunk in traffic. He still has to work on his offensive technique and to improve his free-throw shooting. As a young player, he was good at running the floor and making plays on the perimeter, with his good athletic ability, nice size, and good leaping ability. He is a good rebounder, and a good defender as well. He once set a world record, by dunking on a 12-foot-high basket.

Professional career

Europe
In 2000, Javtokas joined Lietuvos rytas and quickly became the best center in the Lithuanian League. Javtokas, playing alongside Ramūnas Šiškauskas, Arvydas Macijauskas, Simas Jasaitis and Rimantas Kaukėnas won the 2002 Lithuanian League championship and also the North European League championship. After the motorcycle crash, Javtokas missed the entire 2003 season and came back in 2004. In 2005, he won the EuroCup championship and he was named the EuroCup Finals MVP.

In 2006, with his help, Rytas made a strong debut in the EuroLeague, and also beat their main rival Žalgiris 4–0 in Lithuanian league finals series. The team also won the Baltic League Championship. After the season, Javtokas was disappointed that Rytas was not able to offer him a bigger pare of money and also was returning to the EuroCup instead of the EuroLeague, so he decided to play in another club.

He joined Panathinaikos for the 2006–07 season and with them he won the Greek League championship, the Greek Cup title, and the EuroLeague championship (thus winning the coveted Basketball Triple Crown), although he played very limited minutes all season. On July 24, 2007, he signed a two-year contract with Dynamo Moscow of the Russian Super League A. In Dynamo, he improved his free throw percentage from 35.5 to 54.5 percent, and he improved in scoring average to 12.2 points per game. In 2009, he joined the Russian club Khimki Moscow Region. On July 15, 2010 he signed a two-year contract with the Spanish club Power Electronics Valencia.

In June 2011, he returned to Lithuania, and signed a three-year contract with the pro club Žalgiris, of the Lithuanian LKL. His contract was renewed in 2015. On June 20, 2012, Robertas Javtokas was named as one of the best EuroCup players of all time. He took 4th place out of 10. In 2015 his contract was extended for one more year. In 2016 his contract was further extended with Žalgiris.

On June 8, 2017, Javtokas announced his retirement from playing professional basketball. On June 9, 2017, he played his last game as a professional player.

NBA draft rights
Javtokas was selected by the San Antonio Spurs, with 55th overall pick in the 2001 NBA draft. The San Antonio Spurs retained his NBA draft rights for 16 years until 2017 when Javtokas announced his retirement from playing professional basketball. Javtokas is 1 of 8 players selected in the 2001 NBA Draft that ended up never playing a game in the league.

National team career
Javtokas debuted with the senior men's Lithuanian national team at the 2004 Summer Olympics. He averaged 8.9 points, 4.4 rebounds, and 0.5 assists per game. At the EuroBasket 2005, he played in six games with the Lithuanian men's national basketball team. During the tournament, he averaged 11.0 points, 5.8 rebounds, and 1.5 assists per game. His 2-point field goal percentage was 61.7 percent, and his free-throw percentage was 47.1 percent.

He also played with Lithuania at the 2010 FIBA World Championship, where he won a bronze medal.

EuroLeague career statistics

|-
| style="text-align:left;"|2005–06
| style="text-align:left;"|Lietuvos Rytas
| 20 || 20 || 28.8 || .521 || .125 || .417 || 8.2 || .9 || 1.0 || 2.0 || 9.6 || 13.9
|-
| style="text-align:left; background:#AFE6BA;"|2006–07
| style="text-align:left;"|Panathinaikos
| 19 || 3 || 8.8 || .613 ||  || .355 || 1.6 || .1 || .3 || .5 || 2.6 || 2.5
|-
| style="text-align:left;"|2009–10
| style="text-align:left;"|Khimki
| 16 || 13 || 25.7 || .591 || .000 || .457 || 6.4 || .4 || .2 || 1.2 || 10.1 || 12.3
|-
| style="text-align:left;"|2010–11
| style="text-align:left;"|Valencia
| 21 || 20 || 24.7 || .574 || .500 || .414 || 5.3 || .7 || .6 || .7 || 8.2 || 9.1
|-
| style="text-align:left;"|2011–12
| style="text-align:left;" rowspan="6"|Žalgiris
| 16 || 14 || 23.4 || .489 || .000 || .421 || 5.2 || .5 || .2 || .7 || 6.3 || 6.8
|-
| style="text-align:left;"|2012–13
| 8 || 4 || 15.0 || .542 || .500 || .714 || 2.9 || .6 || .1 || .4 || 4.0 || 5.4
|-
| style="text-align:left;"|2013–14
| 23 || 23 || 24.8 || .625 || .273 || .750 || 5.3 || 1.4 || .5 || 1.1 || 9.7 || 12.7
|-
| style="text-align:left;"|2014–15
| 23 || 19 || 23.2 || .451 || .000 || .667 || 4.3 || 1.1 || .4 || .8 || 5.7 || 6.9
|-
| style="text-align:left;"|2015–16
| 9 || 0 || 16.4 || .645 || .000 || .444 || 3.7 || .0 || .3 || .4 || 4.9 || 5.9
|-
| style="text-align:left;"|2016–17
| 17 || 5 || 7.2 || .607 ||  || .625 || 1.4 || .2 || .1 || .0 || 2.3 || 1.9
|- class="sortbottom"
| style="text-align:center;" rowspan="2"|Career
| 155 || 56 || 24.1 || .565 || .194 || .484 || 4.9 || .7 || .4 || .9 || 7.1 || 9.0

Post-playing career
Following his retirement from playing professional basketball, in 2017, Javtokas expressed his wish to not digress from the sport of basketball, and he was invited by Žalgiris Kaunas, to become the sports director of the club. On July 1, 2021, Javtokas left Žalgiris Kaunas in order to participate in the election of the president of the Lithuanian Basketball Federation.

Awards and achievements

Club titles
 9× Lithuanian League Champion: 2000, 2002, 2006, 2012, 2013, 2014, 2015, 2016, 2017
 North European League Champion: 2002
 ULEB Cup (EuroCup) Champion: 2005
 Baltic League Champion: 2006
 Greek Cup Winner: 2007
 EuroLeague Champion: 2007
 Greek League Champion: 2007
 Triple Crown Winner: 2007

Lithuanian senior national team
 EuroBasket 2007: 
 2010 FIBA World Championship: 
 EuroBasket 2013:

Personal awards
 3× Lithuanian League All-Star Game: 2001, 2002, 2006
 Lithuanian League Rookie of the Year: 2001
 Lithuanian All-Star Game MVP: 2002
 EuroCup Finals MVP: 2005
 Led the Lithuanian League in blocked shots: 2006
 Led the Baltic League in blocked shots: 2006
 2× Lithuanian League Slam Dunk Champion: 2000, 2001

Personal life
Javtokas attended to St. Vincent – St. Mary High School in Akron, Ohio, the same secondary school that LeBron James went to growing up. Javtokas also attended Bishop McGuinness High School in Winston-Salem, North Carolina, for one year of high school during the 1997–1998 school year. His older brother Artūras Javtokas is a former basketball player.

Motorcycle crash
On May 1, 2002, while driving his Honda CBR1100XX motorcycle at a speed of around 200 kilometers per hour (125 miles per hour) towards Vilnius, he had a serious accident. Approaching a side road, Javtokas started to pass a van, but the van driver did not see the motorcycle and turned left. There was no chance for Javtokas to stop and he hit the van, losing control but not the bike, which crashed into a car in the opposite lane. Javtokas flew dozens of meters and landed in bushes off the road, crushing his thighbone, breaking his shoulder, and injuring his knee and kidneys. He returned to basketball for the 2003–04 season.

References

External links

 Robertas Javtokas at ACB.com 
 
 
 Robertas Javtokas at EuroLeague.net
 Robertas Javtokas at FIBA Europe

1980 births
Living people
2006 FIBA World Championship players
2010 FIBA World Championship players
Arizona Wildcats men's basketball players
Basketball players at the 2004 Summer Olympics
Basketball players at the 2008 Summer Olympics
Basketball players at the 2016 Summer Olympics
BC Dynamo Moscow players
BC Khimki players
BC Rytas players
BC Žalgiris players
Centers (basketball)
Greek Basket League players
Liga ACB players
Lithuanian expatriate basketball people in Greece
Lithuanian expatriate basketball people in Russia
Lithuanian expatriate basketball people in Spain
Lithuanian expatriate basketball people in the United States
Lithuanian men's basketball players
Olympic basketball players of Lithuania
Panathinaikos B.C. players
Sportspeople from Šiauliai
San Antonio Spurs draft picks
Valencia Basket players